Science in Action may refer to:

Science in Action (book), 1987 book by Bruno Latour
Science in Action (TV series) television program produced by the California Academy of Sciences
Science in Action (radio programme), radio programme produced by the BBC World Service